Kenya–Vietnam relations are bilateral relations between Kenya and Vietnam. Neither country has a resident ambassador.

History
Relations between both countries remain cordial.

Both countries seek to expand relations. The Deputy Vietnamese Minister for Trade, Le Duong Quang was quoted saying that Vietnam would work closely with Kenya and pursue deeper trade and diplomatic ties.

Kenya and Vietnam are both members of the Non-aligned movement.

Official visits
PM Nguyễn Xuân Phúc hosted a reception for Cabinet Secretary (CS) for Foreign Affairs Kenya Monica Juma.

CS for Foreign Affairs Kenya Monica Juma also met with Deputy PM Phạm Bình Minh in Hanoi in late 2019.

Both the Deputy PM and the CS for Foreign Affairs agreed that stronger collaboration in fields such as economy, culture, education and IT was necessary. As well as establishing a political consultation mechanism between foreign ministries.

Economic relations
Vietnam seeks to improve trade ties with Kenya. Trade between both countries doubled between the first quarters of 2010 and 2011.

In 2011, Vietnam exported goods worth KES. 82 million (US$1 million) to Kenya. In 2012, Vietnam's export value to Kenya jumped to KES. 6.56 billion (US$80 million).

The main goods exported from Vietnam to Kenya include: rice, computer, electronic parts and plastic products.

Kenya is considered an access point to East African markets.

Transport
Kenya Airways will from 30 March 2015 become Africa's first carrier to offer direct flights to Vietnam.

Diplomatic missions
Kenya's embassy in Thailand is accredited to Vietnam. Vietnam's embassy in Tanzania is accredited to Kenya.

External links
Embassy of Kenya in Bangkok, Thailand
Embassy of Vietnam in Dar-es-Salaam, Tanzania

References

 
Vietnam
Bilateral relations of Vietnam